Auktyon is a Russian alternative rock band from Saint Petersburg.

The band was founded by Leonid Fyodorov at the Polytechnic Institute of Leningrad. Though they originally played post-punk and new wave, the group came to be influenced by European and Central Asian folk music, avant-garde jazz, the poetry of Russian futurist Velimir Khlebnikov, and aspects of Russian high culture and literature.

Auktyon was particularly popular from 1987 through 1995, but became less active in the late 1990s when Fyodorov began to produce records for Leningrad. The group continues to play together and to release new albums. They toured the United States in 2006 in support of their first US release, the album Pioneer. The group returned to the US in 2008 when they released the album Girls Sing.

Band members

Current members 
 Leonid Fedorov — vocals, electric guitar, acoustic guitar, percussion (1978—present)
 Viktor Bondarik — bass (1980—1983, 1985—present)
 Oleg Garkusha — vocals, dance, declamation, show, lyrics (1985—present), sound engineer, lyrics, other (1980—1985)
 Dmitriy Ozersky — keyboards, trumpet, percussion, lyrics (1981—present)
 Nikolay Rubanov — saxophones, bass-clarinet, jaleika, keyboards (1986—наши дни)
 Boris Shaveinikov — drums, percussion (1988—present)
 Mikhail Kolovsky — tuba, trombone (1995—present)
 Vladimir Volkov — double bass, keyboards (2007—present)
 Yuriy Parfyonov — trumpet (2011—present)
 Mikhail Rappoport — sound engineer (1987—present)

Former members 
Блю Бойз/Параграф/Фаэтон (1978—1983)
 Dmitriy Zaychenko — bass, electric organ (1978-1980)
 Aleksey Vikhrev — drums (1978-1980)
 Mikhail Makov — guitar, vocals (1980-?)
 Aleksey Vittel — guitar (1980-?)
 Alexander Pompeev — keyboards (1980-1981)
 Sergey Skvortsov — lighting engineer (1981-1988), director (1987—1988)
 Sergey Melnik — guitar (1981—1983)
 Evgeniy Chumichev — drums (1981—1983)
 Sergey Gubenko — bass (1983)
 Valeriy Nedomovniy — vocals (1983)
 Sergey Lobachev — vocals, guitar (1983)

Аукцион/АукцЫон (1983—present)
 Sergey Skvortsov — lighting engineer (1981-1988), director (1987—1988)
 Evgeniy Chumichev — drums (1981—1983)
 Sergey Gubenko — bass (1983)
 Sergey Lobachev — vocals, guitar (1983)
 Igor Cheridnik — drums (1985—1988)
 Nikolay Fedorovich — saxophone (1985—1987)
 Arkadiy Volk — vocals (1985)
 ??? [unknown name] — bass (1985) [friend of Arkadiy Volk]
 Sergey Rogozhin — vocals (1985—1987)
 Kirill Miller — visual artist, stage design, costume design, artwork (1985—1992)
 ??? [unknown name] — drums (1988) [drummer of "Лес" band]
 Pavel Litvinov — percussion (1987—2005)
 Igor Skaldin — guitar (1987)
 Dmitriy Matkovsky — guitar (1987—1995)
 Vladimir Vesyolkin — dance, show, vocals (1987—1992)
 Evgeniy Dyatlov — vocals, violin (1988)

Timeline

Discography

Studio albums

References

External links
Official Website (English)
Official Website (Russian)

Russian rock music groups
Musical groups from Saint Petersburg
Musical groups established in 1978
1978 establishments in the Soviet Union
Soviet rock music groups